, also known as Eggzavier the Eggasaurus, is a Japanese anime television series created by Tatsunoko Productions. The series was paired with Hyppo and Thomas as part of Tic Tac Toons.

Synopsis 
Tatsunoko's description of the series reads as follows: "Tamagon is a cute monster who is fond of eggs. He acts as a counselor to those in trouble, asking only eggs in payment. He goes to work as soon as he has eaten his fee. However, despite his schemes, his service usually ends in failure and he winds up being chased by his irate clients. Short as it is, this program is full of lively laughs and humor."

Japanese cast
 Narrated by Hiroshi Ohtake
 Tōru Ōhira as Tamagon

References

External links
 

1972 anime television series debuts
Comedy anime and manga
Fuji TV original programming
Tatsunoko Production